Stultutragus is a genus of beetles in the family Cerambycidae, containing the following species:

 Stultutragus bifasciatus (Zajciw, 1965)
 Stultutragus cerdai (Penaherrera-Leiva & Tavakilian, 2003)
 Stultutragus crotonaphilus Clarke, 2010
 Stultutragus endoluteus Bezark, Santos-Silva & Martins, 2011
 Stultutragus fenestratus (Lucas, 1857)
 Stultutragus linsleyi (Fisher, 1947)
 Stultutragus maytaybaphilus Clarke, 2010
 Stultutragus nigricornis Fisher, 1947
 Stultutragus poecilus (Bates, 1873)
 Stultutragus xantho (Bates, 1873)

References

Rhinotragini